USS Hoptree (AN-62/YN-83) was a  that served in the U.S. Navy during World War II. Hoptree performed her tour of duty in the Pacific Ocean and, post-war, she was decommissioned and sold.

Built in Maine 
Hoptree (AN-62), a wooden-hulled net layer, was launched on 14 October 1943 by Snow Shipyards Inc., Rockland, Maine, as YN-83; sponsored by Lt. Ann Jameson; reclassified AN-62, on 20 January 1944; and commissioned on 18 May 1944.

World War II service

Pacific Ocean operations
Arriving at the Melville Net Depot for shakedown on 31 May 1944, Hoptree performed training and readiness operations until 27 June, when she joined the Net Layer Pre-commissioning and Training Group at Melville, Rhode Island. She then departed on 2 December for the U.S. West Coast and sailed on 3 February 1945 from the Naval Net Depot, Tiburon, California, for duty in the Pacific Ocean.

Hoptree arrived Pearl Harbor, Hawaii, on 13 February 1945 and was routed on to Eniwetok Atoll, where she arrived the 28th. From March through the end of the war the ship was engaged in the vital work of maintaining and repairing net defenses in the harbor, and after August she was occupied in dismantling them.

She sailed back to the United States in November 1945, arriving at San Francisco, California, on 8 November.

Post-war decommissioning
Decommissioned on 1 March 1946, deemed surplus to Navy needs, and made available for disposal, Hoptree was stricken from the List of Naval Vessels on 20 March 1946.

Subsequent maritime career
She was delivered to her purchaser, Van Camp Sea Food Company, San Pedro, California, on 23 April 1947. She operated on mercantile service until scrapped in 1954.

References 
  
 NavSource Online: USS Hoptree (AN-62)

 

Ailanthus-class net laying ships of the United States Navy
Ships built in Rockland, Maine
1943 ships
World War II net laying ships of the United States